The Union for Democracy (UD) is a Saint Martin political party founded in 2011 by Daniel Gibbs.

Electoral history

Parliamentary elections

Territorial elections

References 

Political parties established in 2011
Political parties in the Collectivity of Saint Martin